Belouis Some (born Neville Keighley; 12 December 1959) is a British singer, songwriter and musician. He had UK and Worldwide hits in the 1980s with "Some People", "Imagination" and "Round, Round" from the John Hughes film Pretty in Pink.
"Some People" and "Imagination" charted on the U.S. Billboard Hot 100 in 1985.

Career

1980s
Neville Keighley grew up in Forest Hill, south London. He started playing guitar and writing songs while at school (Dulwich Prep London and Royal Russell School). After leaving school in 1978, Keighley spent several years developing his songwriting, recording demos and playing small gigs.

Keighley's first release was "Lose It to You" on The Cue Record Label in 1981 under the name Nevil Rowe. This record was produced at Crescent Studios, Bath, by David Lord and Darren Hatch, later of the Italo disco group My Mine. Roland Orzabal and Curt Smith from the band Graduate, later Tears for Fears, played on the recording with Manny Elias on drums. 
 
In 1982, Keighley formed his first band and started performing live gigs in and around London under the new name Belouis Some. The lineup included guitarist Scott Taylor who later became a founding member of Then Jerico and on keyboards Phil Harrison from The Korgis. Belouis Some played numerous gigs over the next year with his band developing his songs and musical style and after a gig at The Embassy Club, Old Bond Street in the summer of 1983 Belouis Some signed to Tritec Music owned by Paul and Michael Berrow, who at the time  managed Duran Duran.
 
In October 1983, Belouis Some was signed to Parlophone by EMI's David Ambrose. The single "Target Practice" was released in Spring 1984, his first single on a major label. To promote the release Belouis Some supported Nik Kershaw on Kershaw's Human Racing UK tour 1984.

In 1985, a new version of "Target Practice" was recorded and produced by Steve Thompson and Michael Barbiero; this new track was included on Belouis Some's first album and also later released as a single.

Some People

Belouis Some's first album Some People was released in 1985.

Some People was produced by Steve Thompson and Michael Barbiero in New York City late 1984 early 1985, recorded at Media Sound. Guitarist Carlos Alomar arranged and played on the sessions along with Bernard Edwards, Tony Thompson, Dave LeBolt, Jimmy Maelen, Carmine Rojas, Alan Childs, Rick Bell, Jack Waldman, Robin Clark, Frank Simms and Earl Slick. 
Initial production had taken place on some tracks in London at Maison Rouge, Good Earth and AIR Studios produced by Ian Little and Pete Schwier with musicians Guy Fletcher, Chester Kamen, Andy Duncan, Gary Twigg, Gary Barnacle.

The video for the first single release from the album "Imagination" was directed by Storm Thorgerson and caused controversy as it contained full frontal nudity, using the 12" version it was a big success in bars and clubs, the worldwide premier of the "Imagination" video was held at Studio 54. An alternative version removed the nudity and used the 7" edit of the track suitable for MTV and mainstream TV. The video for the second single, "Some People", also directed by Thorgerson, was used as a Swatch television advertisement in the U.S.

"Some People" and "Imagination" were both US Hot Dance Club Play hits.

In spring 1985, Belouis Some supported Frankie Goes to Hollywood on their North American tour with band members Chester Kamen, Gary Twigg, Larry Tolfree, Bias Boshell, Robin Clark and Sandy Bar. Belouis Some was sponsored by Swatch on the tour.

Belouis Some's contribution to the Pretty in Pink soundtrack (released February 1986) "Round,Round" was written specially for the film and produced by Bernard Edwards, recorded in Los Angeles August 1985. The album was listed on   "The 25 Greatest Soundtracks of All Time" list in Rolling Stone 

"Round,Round" propelled Belouis Some towards audiences outside of the clubs and college radio in USA and so, after worldwide chart success and extensive touring, the single "Imagination" was re-issued in the UK  and become a hit in the United Kingdom Spring 1986. Both "Some People" and "Imagination" were remixed and re-issued several times.

"Imagination" can be heard in the films Ghost Chase (Hollywood-Monster) and The Business. and has been used in many national and international TV adverts including Panasonic, Barclays Bank and Rimmel London

In May 1986, whilst on tour in the UK, Belouis Some also performed in Swatch Live at the Beacon Theatre New York. Swatch Live also featured skateboarder Rodney Mullen. 

In the summer of 1986, Belouis Some was one of the support acts on Queen's Magic Tour appearing at Knebworth, Paris and Manchester.

Belouis Some

In late 1986, Belouis Some recorded his second album Belouis Some at Right Track and The Hit Factory New York, produced by Gary Langan and Guy Fletcher. Main band members were Carlos Alomar, Geoff Dugmore, Carmine Rojas, Chester Kamen  and Fletcher on keyboards. Also Jimmy Maelen (The Borneo Horns), Lenny Pickett, Steve Elson, Stan Harrison.
 Pete Townshend, Julian Lennon and Neal X made guest appearances on the album. The album was mixed in London at Eel Pie Recording Studios and Roundhouse Recording Studios.

"Let It Be with You" and "Animal Magic" were also both US Hot Dance Club Play hits.

In Spring 1988 Belouis Some toured USA, Carmine Rojas (musical director/ bass) put the band together with Alan Childs (drums), Doug Worthington (guitar), Chuck Kentis (keys), Frank Elmo (sax), Kati Mac and Kim Lesley (backing vocals).

In 1989, Belouis Some formed The Big Broadcast. The band toured the UK throughout the summer playing small venues and clubs.

1990-95: Living Your Life
In 1993, Belouis Some released the album Living Your Life on BMG Records. The album was recorded at Marcus Recording Studios in London and produced by Geoff Dugmore and Nigel Butler. Musicians included Karl Hyde, Steve Barnacle, Peter Oxendale and J.J. Belle.
"Sometimes" and "Something She Said" were released as singles in the UK and Europe.

In 1995, Belouis Some released the single "Let Me Love You for Tonight" produced by Richard "Biff" Stannard (Biffco) and Matt Rowe.

2019-present
In 2019, Belouis Some performed at the 80's orientated Let's Rock summer festivals across the UK.

In February 2023, producer Lee Rose with Belouis Some released a tech house version of "Imagination" on Deevu Records.

Personal life
Belouis Some lives in London and is married to Swedish model Eva Linderholm, they have two daughters.

Discography

Albums
Some People (1985)
Belouis Some (1987)
Living Your Life (1993)

Singles

See also
List of performers on Top of the Pops
Nudity in music videos
Concerts at Knebworth House
List of Second British Invasion artists

References

External links
[ Belouis Some biography] at AllMusic

1959 births
Living people
English male singers
English pop singers
English new wave musicians
Singers from London
People from Forest Hill, London
Sophisti-pop musicians
Male new wave singers
Parlophone artists
Capitol Records artists
EMI Records artists
Arista Records artists
Ariola Records artists
Second British Invasion artists